Zinc finger protein 780B is a protein that in humans is encoded by the ZNF780B gene.

References

Further reading 

Human proteins